Black Lough may refer to:

 Ballysaggart Lough, in Dungannon, County Tyrone, Northern Ireland
 Black Lough (Kerry) in the Gap of Dunloe, a mountain pass in County Kerry, Republic of Ireland